Josef Isaakovitch Press (1880 or 1881 in Vilnius – October 4, 1924 in Rochester, New York) was a Russian cellist, alumni of Petrograd Conservatory. He performed in the concerts of the Society for Jewish Folk Music which also featured violinists Jascha Heifetz and Efrem Zimbalist the bass Feodor Chaliapin. In 1921, he emigrated to America with his brother, Michael Press. He died of pneumonia.

References

1880s births
1924 deaths
Cellists from the Russian Empire
Musicians from Vilnius
Saint Petersburg Conservatory alumni
Deaths from pneumonia in New York (state)
20th-century cellists
Soviet emigrants to the United States